M'Naguer (also written M'Nagueur) is a town and commune in Taibet District, Touggourt Province, Algeria. According to the 2008 census it has a population of 14,179, up from 11,243 in 1998, and an annual population growth rate of 2.4%.

Geography

M'Naguer lies at an elevation of  surrounded by palm groves, forming one of many scattered oases lying between Touggourt and El Oued. Beyond the oasis are the sand dunes of the Grand Erg Oriental desert.

Climate

Like most towns in Saharan Africa, M'Naguer has a hot desert climate, with very hot summers and mild winters, and very little precipitation throughout the year.

Economy

Agriculture is the primary economic activity of M'Naguer, accounting for 63% of the economy. Palm farming is the most significant crop, although other fruits and vegetables are grown, along with the rearing of livestock such as sheep, goats, camels and cattle.

The economy of M'Naguer also benefits from tourism; the oasis, the diversity of plants and animals, and architectural sites are important attractions. Traditional industries such as pottery, weaving and knitting are also significant.

Transportation

M'Naguer lies on the N16 national highway between Touggourt  to the west and El Oued  to the northeast. The town is  distant from the provincial capital Ouargla.

The municipality of M'Naguer has an estimated  of local roads.

Education

2.8% of the population has a tertiary education (the second lowest in the province), and another 11.8% has completed secondary education. The overall literacy rate is 66.1%, and is 75.3% among males (the second lowest in the province) and 56.3% among females.

Localities
The commune is composed of 16 localities:

M'Nagueur El Gherbi
El Bahri
El Hamraya
Oum Zebed Dahraouia
Oum Zebed Zaouia
Mouih El Kebche
Mouih Benali
Mouih Righi Gebli
Chabbi
Louibed
Boutara
El Asli
Sliaa
Tarfaya
Boukhechba
Chott Merouane

References

Neighbouring towns and cities

Communes of Ouargla Province